Patrick Murray "Pat" Smythe (24 March 1860 – 19 March 1935) was an Anglican priest in the second quarter of the 20th century. He was born into a clerical family on 24 March 1860 and educated at Charterhouse and Keble College, Oxford.

Ordained in 1883, he was initially a curate at St Mark's, Swindon and then held incumbencies at Rockingham, Westbury and Kettering before being appointed Provost of St Ninian's Cathedral, Perth in 1911, a post he held for 24 years.

A great angler, he died on 19 March 1935, five days before his 75th birthday.

References

1860 births

1935 deaths
People educated at Charterhouse School

Alumni of Keble College, Oxford
Provosts of St Ninian's Cathedral, Perth